Ústí is a municipality and village in Přerov District in the Olomouc Region of the Czech Republic. It has about 600 inhabitants.

History
The first written mention of Ústí is from 1389.

References

Villages in Přerov District